Market Square is a town square and shopping centre located in the downtown core next to Chinatown in Victoria, British Columbia, Canada. There are more than 35 shops, restaurants, and clubs in the square.

External links

Buildings and structures in Victoria, British Columbia
Shopping malls in British Columbia
Tourist attractions in Victoria, British Columbia